Mumbai Central (or Bombay Central) was one of the Lok Sabha constituencies in Maharashtra. It became defunct in 1977 when constituency boundaries were redrawn.

Members of Parliament
 1952 : Seat did not exist
 1957 (two-members seat) : S A Dange (CPI) and G K Manay (SCF) 
 1962 : Seat did not exist
 1967 : R. D. Bhandare (INC)
 1971 : R. D. Bhandare (INC)
 1977 onwards : Seat does not exist

Election results

1967 Lok Sabha
 R. D. Bhandare (INC) : 158,060 votes 
 P. K. Atre (Ind / RPI) : 151,108

1971 Lok Sabha
 R. D. Bhandare (INC) : 216,114 votes 
 Manohar Joshi (SHS) : 116,572

See also
 List of Constituencies of the Lok Sabha

References

External links
Election Statistics, Election Commission of India

Former Lok Sabha constituencies of Maharashtra
Former constituencies of the Lok Sabha